Coming Home is the studio album by the Contemporary Christian and gospel singer Raymond Cilliers.

Track listing 
"You Are"
"Like a Fire"
"Forever Reign"
"Miracle Maker"
"Coming Home"
"My Tribute"
"Dance With Me"
"It's Done"
"Lion of Judah"
"Born to Live"
"You've Shown Me Mercy"
"Our God"

Charts

Weekly charts

References 

2007 albums
Raymond Cilliers albums